Men's marathon races for wheelchair athletes at the 2004 Summer Paralympics followed a course from Marathon to the Panathinaiko Stadium, and started at 08:00 on 26 September. Events were held in three wheelchair disability classes, together with two classes of visually impaired athletes.

T51
The T51 event was won by Alvise de Vidi, representing .

T52
The T52 event was won by Toshihiro Takada, representing .

T54
The T54 event was won by Kurt Fearnley, representing .

References

M
2004 marathons
Marathons at the Paralympics
Men's marathons